Sibongakonke Ntuthuko Mbatha (born 1 January 1998) is a South African football midfielder.

He has been capped by South Africa at the under-17 and under-20 levels.

References

External links
 Sibongakonke Mbatha at ESPN FC

Living people
Indian Super League players
1998 births
South African soccer players
South African expatriate soccer players
Expatriate footballers in India
Association football midfielders
Bidvest Wits F.C. players
Platinum Stars F.C. players
ATK (football club) players
South Africa youth international soccer players
South Africa under-20 international soccer players